Giver is a Canadian children's television series, which premiered on TVOntario's TVOKids programming block in 2012. Hosted by Michael Lagimodiere, each episode enlists a team of local children to assist in creating, designing and building a new or renovated public park in an Ontario community in collaboration with professional designers and contractors.

To celebrate Canada's 150th birthday Giver 150 was slated to release on July 1, 2017. Giver 150 set to build the largest playground in the country, to be located in Ottawa at Mooney Bay. Over 400 volunteers ranging from kids to adults from all over the country helped build the playground. The 50,000 square foot playground is shaped like Canada and has different play space representing each of the country’s provinces and territories.

The series is a three-time Canadian Screen Award nominee for Children's or Youth Non-Fiction Program, at the 1st Canadian Screen Awards in 2013, the 3rd Canadian Screen Awards in 2015 and the 4th Canadian Screen Awards in 2016. The show won a Daytime Emmy Award at the 45th Annual Daytime Emmy Awards for "Outstanding Education or Informational Series".

Episodes

Awards and nominations

References

External links
 

2010s Canadian reality television series
Canadian children's reality television series
Canadian children's education television series
TVO original programming
2010s Canadian children's television series
2012 Canadian television series debuts
2017 Canadian television series endings
Television series about children